The X-15 or North American X-15 is an American experimental hypersonic research aircraft.

X-15 may also refer to:
 X-15 (film), a 1961 movie
 X-15 (band), a rock band from Bellingham, Washington, USA

See also
 Thomas 15X Johnson
 Bell XV-15